Tarabai Shinde (1850–1910) was a feminist activist who protested patriarchy and caste in 19th century India. She is known for her published work, Stri Purush Tulana ("A Comparison Between Women and Men"), originally published in Marathi in 1882. The pamphlet is a critique of caste and patriarchy, and is often considered the first modern Indian feminist text. It was very controversial for its time in challenging the Hindu religious scriptures themselves as a source of women's oppression, a view that continues to be controversial and debated today. She was a member of Satyashodhak Samaj.

Early life and family
Born in Maratha Family in the year 1850 to Bapuji Hari Shinde in Buldhana, Berar Province, in present-day Maharashtra, she was a founding member of the Satyashodhak Samaj, Pune. Her father was a radical and head clerk in the office of Deputy Commissioner of Revenues, he also published a book titled, "Hint to the Educated Natives" in 1871. There was no girls' school in the area. Tarabai was the only daughter and was taught Marathi, Sanskrit and English by her father. She also had four brothers. Tarabai was married when quite young, but was granted more freedom in the household than most other Marathi wives of the time since her husband moved into her parents' home.

Social work 
Shinde was associate of social activists Jotirao and Savitribai Phule; both husband & wife and were a founding member of their  Satyashodhak Samaj ("Truth Finding Community") organisation. The Phules shared with Shinde an awareness of the separate axes of oppression that constitute gender and caste, as well as the  intermeshed nature of the two.

"Stri Purush Tulana" 
Tarabai Shindes popular literary work is "Stri Purush Tulana" .In her essay, Shinde criticised the social inequality of caste, as well as the patriarchal views of other activists who saw caste as the main form of antagonism in Hindu society. According to Susie Tharu and K. Lalita, "...Stri Purush Tulana is probably the first full fledged and extant feminist argument after the poetry of the Bhakti Period. But Tarabai's work is also significant because at a time when intellectuals and activists alike were primarily concerned with the hardships of a Hindu widow's life and other easily identifiable atrocities perpetrated on women, Tarabai Shinde, apparently working in isolation, was able to broaden the scope of analysis to include the ideological fabric of patriarchal society. Women everywhere, she implies, are similarly oppressed."

Stri Purush Tulana was written in response to an article which appeared in 1881, in Pune Vaibhav, an orthodox newspaper published from Pune, about a criminal case against a young Brahmin widow, Vijayalakshmi in Surat, who had been convicted of murdering her illegitimate son for the fear of public disgrace and ostracism and sentenced to be hanged (later appealed and modified to transportation for life). Having worked with upper-caste widows who were forbidden to remarry, Shinde was well aware of incidents of widows being impregnated by relatives. The book analysed the tightrope women must walk between the "good woman" and the "prostitute". The book was printed at Shri Shivaji Press, Pune, in 1882 with 500 copies at cost nine annas, but hostile reception by contemporary society and press, meant that she did not publish again. The work however was praised by Jyotirao Phule, a prominent Marathi social reformer, who referred to Tarabai as chiranjivini (dear daughter) and recommended her pamphlet to colleagues. The work finds mention in the second issue of Satsar, the magazine of Satyashodhak Samaj, started by Jyotiba Phule in 1885, however thereafter the work remained largely unknown till 1975, when it was rediscovered and republished.

See also
 Jyotirao Phule, another revolutionary who fought for the rights of women and dalits.
Savitribai Phule, Wife of Jyotirao Phule, and social reformer.

References

Sources
 Shinde, Tarabai. 1882. Stri purush tulana. (Translated by Maya Pandit). In S. Tharu and K. Lalita (Eds.) "Women writing in India. 600 B.C. to the present. Volume I: 600 B.C. to the early 20th century". The City University of New York City : The Feminist Press.
 Gail Omvedt. 1995. Dalit Vision, Orient Longman
 Chakravarti, Uma and Gill, Preeti (eds). Shadow Lives: Writings on Widowhood. Kali for Women, Delhi.
 O'Hanlon, Rosalind. 2000. A Comparison Between Women and Men : Tarabai Shinde and the Critique of Gender Relations in Colonial India. Delhi, Oxford University Press, 2000, 144 p., .
 O'Hanlon, Rosalind. 1991. Issues of Widowhood: Gender and Resistance in Colonial Western India, in Douglas Haynes and Gyan Prakash (eds) "Contesting Power. Resistance and Everyday Social Relations in South Asia", Oxford University Press, New Delhi.
 O'Hanlon, Rosalind. 1994. For the Honour of My Sister Countrywomen: Tarabai Shinde and the Critique of Gender Relations in Colonial India, Oxford University Press, Oxford.

1850 births
1910 deaths
Indian feminist writers
Women writers from Maharashtra
Indian women's rights activists
Marathi people
Indian social reformers
Indian feminists
Marathi-language writers
Writers from Maharashtra
19th-century Indian women writers
19th-century Indian writers
20th-century Indian women writers
20th-century Indian writers
People from Buldhana district
Indian women activists
Activists from Maharashtra